= Solanilla (Albacete) =

Village in Albacete, Spain

Coordinates: 38°41′30″N 2°30′14″W

Solanilla (Albacete) is a village in Albacete, Castile-La Mancha, Spain.
